Events in the year 1874 in Germany.

Incumbents

National level
 Kaiser – William I
 Chancellor – Otto von Bismarck

State level

Kingdoms
 King of Bavaria – Ludwig II of Bavaria
 King of Prussia – Kaiser William I
 King of Saxony – Albert of Saxony
 King of Württemberg – Charles of Württemberg

Grand Duchies
 Grand Duke of Baden – Frederick I
 Grand Duke of Hesse – Louis III
 Grand Duke of Mecklenburg-Schwerin – Frederick Francis II
 Grand Duke of Mecklenburg-Strelitz – Frederick William
 Grand Duke of Oldenburg – Peter II
 Grand Duke of Saxe-Weimar-Eisenach – Charles Alexander

Principalities
 Schaumburg-Lippe – Adolf I, Prince of Schaumburg-Lippe
 Schwarzburg-Rudolstadt – George Albert, Prince of Schwarzburg-Rudolstadt
 Schwarzburg-Sondershausen – Günther Friedrich Karl II, Prince of Schwarzburg-Sondershausen
 Principality of Lippe – Leopold III, Prince of Lippe
 Reuss Elder Line – Heinrich XXII, Prince Reuss of Greiz
 Reuss Younger Line – Heinrich XIV, Prince Reuss Younger Line
 Waldeck and Pyrmont – George Victor, Prince of Waldeck and Pyrmont

Duchies
 Duke of Anhalt – Frederick I, Duke of Anhalt
 Duke of Brunswick – William, Duke of Brunswick
 Duke of Saxe-Altenburg – Ernst I, Duke of Saxe-Altenburg
 Duke of Saxe-Coburg and Gotha – Ernest II, Duke of Saxe-Coburg and Gotha
 Duke of Saxe-Meiningen – Georg II, Duke of Saxe-Meiningen

Events
 10 January – German federal election, 1874

Date unknown
 German company HeidelbergCement is founded.

Science 
 Georg Cantor's paper, Ueber eine Eigenschaft des Inbegriffes aller reellen algebraischen Zahlen ("On a Property of the Collection of All Real Algebraic Numbers") is published in Crelle's Journal, considered as the origin of set theory.

Births

 1 January –Gustav Albin Weißkopf, German-born aviation pioneer (died 1927)
 1 February – Hugo von Hofmannsthal, German poet, dramatist and novelist (died 1929)
 19 February – Max Adalbert, German actor (died 1933)
 20 March – Börries von Münchhausen, German poet (died 1945)
 7 April – Friedrich Kayßler, German actor (died 1945)
 15 April – Johannes Stark, German physicist and Nobel Prize laureate (died 1957)
 20 April – Carl Bergmann, German banker and diplomat (died 1935)
 3 May – Ernst Scholz, German lawyer and politician (died 1932)
 4 May – Bernhard Hoetger, German painter (died 1949)
 2 June – Ludwig Roselius, German businessman (died 1943)
 5 July – Eugen Fischer, German physician (died 1967)
 7 July – Erwin Bumke, German judge (died 1945)
 17 July – Max Maurenbrecher, SPD and Fatherland Party politician (died 1930)
 28 July – Ernst Cassirer, German philosopher (died 1945)
 29 July – August Stramm, German poet and playwright (died 1915)
 27 August – Carl Bosch, German chemist and Nobel Prize laureate (died 1940)
 12 September – Paul Kuhn, German operatic tenor (died 1966)
 21 September – Karl Jarres, German politician (died 1951)
 15 October - Alfred, Hereditary Prince of Saxe-Coburg and Gotha, German nobleman (died 1899)
 16 October – Otto Mueller, German painter (died 1930)
 17 October – Ludwig Siebert, German politician (died 1942)
 1 November - Wilhelm Dittmann, German politician (died 1954)
 14 November – Adolf Brand, German writer (died 1945)
 17 November – Eduard Fresenius, German entrepreneur (died 1946)
 11 December - Paul Wegener, German actor (died 1948)
 14 December – Adam Stegerwald, German politician (died 1945)
 26 December – Hans von Rosenberg, German diplomat and politician (died 1937)

Deaths

 5 January - Ernst Gotthelf Gersdorf, German writer and librarian (born 1804)
 14 January – Johann Philipp Reis, German scientist (born 1834)
 19 January – August Heinrich Hoffmann von Fallersleben (born 1798)
 26 February - Johann Georg Ludwig Hesekiel, German writer (born 1819)
 1 April – August Heinrich Hermann von Dönhoff, Gernan statesman (born 1797)
 7 April - Wilhelm von Kaulbach, German painter (born 1805)
 20 April – Gustav Bläser, German sculptor (born 1813)
 23 October – Abraham Geiger, German rabbi and scholar, considered the founding father of Reform Judaism (born 1810)
 2 November - Ernst Gotthelf Gersdorf, German writer and librarian (born 1804)
 15 November - Heinrich Brockhaus, German publisher (born 1804)
 7 December - Constantin von Tischendorf, German biblical scholar  (born 1815)
 27 December – Ernst Litfaß, German printer and publisher (born 1816)

References

 
Years of the 19th century in Germany
Germany
Germany